The 1912 Buchtel football team represented Buchtel College in the 1912 college football season. The team was led by head coach Frank Haggerty, in his third season. Buchtel outscored their opponents by a total of 105–36.

Schedule

References

Buchtel
Akron Zips football seasons
Buchtel football